Markus Lupfer is a German fashion designer and founder of the eponymous company, based in London, United Kingdom. He is best known for his statement knitwear designs and sequinned lip-motif appliques.

Life and career
Lupfer was born in a small town in Southern Germany called Kisslegg. 
After attending the University of Trier he moved to the UK to study fashion design at London's University of Westminster. Notable alumni include other well-known designers such as Vivienne Westwood and Burberry's former chief executive officer Christopher Bailey. 

After graduating from Westminster in 1997 with a first-class honors degree, his final year collection was bought by Koh Samui, a London-based boutique, and sold out within two weeks. 

In 1999, Lupfer made his prêt-à-porter debut at the London Fashion Week. 

Lupfer is particularly known for his unique statement knitwear designs and sequinned lip-motif appliqués. Vogue.com's Chief Fashion Critic Sarah Mower describes his approach to sequinned embroidery as “very clever in making his sequinned sweaters an item with a bit of a cult following that draws followers from a really surprisingly broad customer-base. They strike such a great balance between easy and dressed-up and witty and smart – pieces to make people from teenagers to grown-ups smile and feel good in it almost anywhere“.

Brand
Lupfer is sold in many high-end retailers worldwide including Harrods, Selfridges, Harvey Nichols, Net-A-Porter, IT Hong Kong, Le Bon Marche Paris, Isetan, Hanwha Galleria, Shopbop, and Tsum. The brand launched an ecommerce store in 2014.

Awards
Lupfer won his first award in 2001, the British Fashion Council's New Generation Award, shortly after leaving university. 

In 2008, Lupfer received the Best Designer of the Year-Award at the Prix de la Mode Awards in Spain and two years later, in 2010, became the International Designer of the Year at the Scottish Fashion Awards.

Notable Clients
Lupfer's designs have been worn by celebrities such as Rihanna, Madonna, Beyoncé, Miley Cyrus, Jennifer Lopez, Katy Perry, Olivia Palermo, Ellie Bamber, Maisie Williams, Cara Delevingne, Elle Macpherson, Salma Hayek and Claudia Schiffer. In addition, the Duchess of Cambridge has worn the brand during her Royal Tour to Germany in 2017.

References

Living people
Year of birth missing (living people)
German fashion designers
Alumni of the University of Westminster
German expatriates in England
University of Trier alumni